The Philly PHLASH Downtown Loop (also known as the Philly PHLASH or PHLASH) is a visitor-friendly public transit service in Philadelphia, Pennsylvania, managed by the Independence Visitor Center Corporation (IVCC).  PHLASH vehicles are ADA-compliant, temperature-controlled New Flyer MiDi buses. The IVCC contracted Krapf Transit to manage vehicle operations.

The PHLASH route is particularly notable for connecting Philadelphia's main tourist attractions, from Penn's Landing on the Delaware River Waterfront, to National Park Service sites like Independence Hall and the Liberty Bell in Independence National Historical Park, to cultural institutions along the Benjamin Franklin Parkway like the Philadelphia Museum of Art, and attractions like the Philadelphia Zoo and Please Touch Museum in Fairmount Park.

More of the attractions located close to the PHLASH route are:

 Penn's Landing
 National Museum of American Jewish History
 Independence Hall
 Liberty Bell
 Museum of the American Revolution
 National Constitution Center
 Pennsylvania Convention Center
 Reading Terminal Market
 The Franklin Institute
 Barnes Foundation
 Philadelphia Museum of Art
 Rodin Museum
 Eastern State Penitentiary
 Please Touch Museum
 Philadelphia Zoo
 Mütter Museum
 The Shops at Liberty Place
 One Liberty Observation Deck

The PHLASH runs weekend (Friday, Saturday, Sunday) service in the spring and fall, and daily service during the summer and holiday season, from 10 a.m. to 6 p.m. on operating days. PHLASH service caters mostly to tourists who are not familiar with the city landscape.

Service history

The PHLASH was first introduced in 1994 by Ed Rendell, who was Mayor of Philadelphia at the time. The service was operated by the city's Center City District starting in the late 1990s. In order to keep fares at a price point attractive to visitors, the PHLASH service has always been subsidized.

By 2011, the state grant that had been providing a subsidy for PHLASH operations was almost exhausted. With Gov. Rendell was leaving the governor's office, additional funding didn't appear to be forthcoming, and the service was in danger of shutting down.

In 2012, the IVCC took over management of the PHLASH under CEO, James J. Cuorato, who believed the PHLASH provided an important service for Philadelphia tourism. Cuorato was able to successfully secure funding by convincing the state legislature to include an allotment for PHLASH in its Transportation Package bill, by partnering with Philadelphia's public transportation provider, SEPTA.

In 2016, PHLASH had a record-breaking season, with 316,000 riders.

Fleet 
All buses are ADA compliant. Prior to the current fleet, the PHLASH operated with replica trolley buses. The service is operated by Krapf Transit.

References

External links

Transportation in Philadelphia